Cyclops is a wooden roller coaster located at Mt. Olympus Water & Theme Park in Wisconsin Dells, Wisconsin.  The ride starts with a left hand 180 degree dive off the lift, traverses three short hills, and a right-handed drop in front of the station (this is the 75 foot largest drop of the ride) and then climbs back up to the brakes.  It is a short terrain roller coaster at only 1,750 feet.

Cyclops first opened in 1995 and was built by Custom Coasters International and is intertwined with Zeus's structure. Cyclops was designed by Dennis McNulty and Larry Bill. The ride operates with a single five car train, built by the Philadelphia Toboggan Company. Like other coasters at Mount Olympus, Cyclops is very rough.  The last car of the train was notable among coaster enthusiasts for the intense ejector "air-time" experienced during the ride, especially on the second hill beside the station. Because of this, only riders 18 and older were allowed in the last two rows. However, in 2014, the second hill was re-profiled, and now anyone over the height of 48 inches can ride in last two rows.  As of 2020, the last car has been removed.

Roller coaster stats
Height: 70 feet
Drop: 75 feet
Top Speed: 58 mph	
Length: 1,900 feet
Trains: 1 - 20 passenger	
Train Mfg: Philadelphia Toboggan Co.
Ride Time: 1 minute

References

Roller coasters in Wisconsin
Roller coasters introduced in 1995